Georg (George) Fredrik Granfelt (19 June 1865, Turku - 5 August 1917) was a Finnish lawyer and politician. He was a member of the Diet of Finland from 1891 to 1906 and of the Parliament of Finland from 1908 to 1909, from 1910 to 1911 and from 1912 to 1913.

References

1865 births
1917 deaths
Politicians from Turku
People from Turku and Pori Province (Grand Duchy of Finland)
Swedish People's Party of Finland politicians
Finnish heraldists
Members of the Diet of Finland
Members of the Parliament of Finland (1908–09)
Members of the Parliament of Finland (1910–11)
Members of the Parliament of Finland (1911–13)
University of Helsinki alumni